Ethan Green Hawke (born November 6, 1970) is an American actor and film director. He has been nominated for numerous accolades including four Academy Awards, two Golden Globe Awards and a Tony Award. Hawke has directed three feature films, three off-Broadway plays, and a documentary. He has also written three novels and one graphic novel. He made his film debut in  Explorers (1985), before making a breakthrough performance in Dead Poets Society (1989). Hawke starred alongside Julie Delpy in Richard Linklater's Before trilogy: Before Sunrise (1995), Before Sunset (2004), and Before Midnight (2013). Hawke has received four Academy Award nominations, two for Best Supporting Actor for Training Day (2001) and Boyhood (2014) and the other two for Best Adapted Screenplay for co-writing Before Sunset and Before Midnight with Linklater and Delpy.

For Hawke's role as the Protestant minister in Paul Schrader's drama First Reformed (2017), he received the Independent Spirit Award for Best Male Lead. Other notable roles include in Reality Bites (1994), Gattaca (1997), Great Expectations (1998), Hamlet (2000), Before the Devil Knows You're Dead (2007), Brooklyn's Finest (2009), Sinister (2012). Maggie's Plan (2015), Born to Be Blue (2015), The Magnificent Seven (2016), Valerian and the City of a Thousand Planets (2017), Juliet, Naked (2018), The Black Phone (2021) and The Northman (2022). 

Hawke directed the narrative films Chelsea Walls (2001), The Hottest State (2006), and Blaze (2018) as well as the documentary Seymour: An Introduction (2014). He created, co-wrote and starred as John Brown in the Showtime limited series The Good Lord Bird (2018), and directed the HBO Max documentary series The Last Movie Stars (2022). He starred in the Marvel television miniseries Moon Knight (2022) as Arthur Harrow.

In addition to his film work, Hawke has appeared in many theater productions. He made his Broadway debut in 1992 in Anton Chekhov's The Seagull, and was nominated for a Tony Award for Best Featured Actor in a Play in 2007 for his performance in Tom Stoppard's The Coast of Utopia. In 2010, Hawke directed Sam Shepard's A Lie of the Mind, for which he received a Drama Desk Award nomination for Outstanding Director of a Play. In 2018, he starred in the Roundabout Theater Company's revival of Sam Shepard's play True West alongside Paul Dano.

Early life
Hawke was born on November 6, 1970 in Austin, Texas, to Leslie (née Green), a charity worker, and James Hawke, an insurance actuary. Hawke's parents were high school sweethearts in Fort Worth, Texas, and married young, when Hawke's mother was 17. Hawke was born a year later. Hawke's parents were both students at the University of Texas at Austin at the time of his birth. They separated and later divorced in 1974, when he was four years old.

After the separation, Hawke was raised by his mother. The two relocated several times, before settling in New York City, where Hawke attended the Packer Collegiate Institute in Brooklyn Heights. Hawke's mother remarried when he was 10 and the family moved to West Windsor Township, New Jersey. There, Hawke attended the public West Windsor Plainsboro High School (renamed to West Windsor-Plainsboro High School South in 1997). He later transferred to the Hun School of Princeton, a secondary boarding school, from which he graduated in 1988.

In high school, Hawke aspired to be a writer, but developed an interest in acting. He made his stage debut at age 13, in a production at The McCarter Theatre of George Bernard Shaw's Saint Joan. He also performed in West Windsor-Plainsboro High School productions of Meet Me in St. Louis and You Can't Take It with You. At the Hun School, he took acting classes at the McCarter Theatre, located on the Princeton campus. After graduation from high school, he studied acting at Carnegie Mellon University in Pittsburgh, dropping out after he was cast in Dead Poets Society (1989). He enrolled in New York University's English program for two years, but dropped out to pursue other acting roles.

Career

1980s: Early years and Dead Poets Society
Hawke obtained his mother's permission to attend his first casting call at the age of 14, and secured his first film role in Joe Dante's Explorers (1985), in which he played an alien-obsessed schoolboy alongside River Phoenix. The film was favorably reviewed but had poor box office results. This failure caused Hawke to quit acting for a brief period after the film's release. Hawke later described the disappointment as difficult to bear at such a young age, adding, "I would never recommend that a kid act."

In 1989, Hawke made his breakthrough appearance in Peter Weir's Dead Poets Society, playing one of the students taught by Robin Williams as a charismatic English teacher. The Variety reviewer noted "Hawke, as the painfully shy Todd, gives a haunting performance." The film received considerable acclaim, winning the BAFTA Award for Best Film and an Academy Award nomination for Best Picture. With revenue of $235 million worldwide, it remains Hawke's most commercially successful movie to date. Hawke later described the opportunities he was offered as a result of the film's success as critical to his decision to continue acting: 

While filming Dead Poets Society he auditioned for what would be his next film, 1989's comedy drama Dad, where he played Ted Danson's son and Jack Lemmon's grandson. Hawke's next film, 1991's White Fang, brought his first leading role. The film, an adaptation of Jack London's novel of the same name, featured Hawke as Jack Conroy, a Yukon gold hunter who befriends a wolfdog (played by Jed). According to The Oregonian, "Hawke does a good job as young Jack ... He makes Jack's passion for White Fang real and keeps it from being ridiculous or overly sentimental." He appeared in Keith Gordon's A Midnight Clear (1992), a well-received war film based on William Wharton's novel of the same name. In the survival drama Alive (1993), adapted from Piers Paul Read's 1974 non-fiction book, Hawke portrayed Nando Parrado, one of the survivors of Uruguayan Air Force Flight 571, which crashed in the Andes.

1990s: Reality Bites, and Before Sunrise
Hawke's next role was in the Generation X drama Reality Bites (1994), in which he played Troy Dyer, a slacker who mocks the ambitions of his girlfriend (played by Winona Ryder). Film critic Roger Ebert called Hawke's performance convincing and noteworthy: "Hawke captures all the right notes as the boorish Troy (and is so convincing it is worth noting that he has played quite different characters equally well in movies as different as "Alive" and "Dead Poets Society")." The New York Times noted, "Mr. Hawke's subtle and strong performance makes it clear that Troy feels things too deeply to risk failure and admit he's feeling anything at all."
The following year Hawke received critical acclaim for his performance in Richard Linklater's 1995 drama Before Sunrise. The film follows a young American man (Hawke) and a young French woman (Julie Delpy), who meet on a train and disembark in Vienna, spending the night exploring the city and getting to know one another. The San Francisco Chronicle praised Hawke's and Delpy's performances: "[they] interact so gently and simply that you feel certain that they helped write the dialogue. Each of them seems to have something personal at stake in their performances."

Away from acting, Hawke directed the music video for the 1994 song "Stay (I Missed You)", by singer-songwriter Lisa Loeb, who was a member of Hawke's theater company at the time. Spin magazine named Hawke and Loeb's video as its video of the year in 1994. In a 2012 interview, Hawke said that the song, which was included in Reality Bites, is the only number-one popular song by an unsigned artist in the history of music.He published his first novel in 1996, The Hottest State, about a love affair between a young actor and a singer. Hawke said of the novel, 
The book met with a mixed reception. Entertainment Weekly said that Hawke "opens himself to rough literary scrutiny in The Hottest State. If Hawke is serious ... he'd do well to work awhile in less exposed venues." The New York Times thought Hawke did "a fine job of showing what it's like to be young and full of confusion", concluding that The Hottest State was ultimately "a sweet love story".

In Andrew Niccol's science fiction film Gattaca (1997), "one of the more interesting scripts" Hawke said he had read in "a number of years", he played the role of a man who infiltrates a society of genetically perfect humans by assuming another man's identity. Although Gattaca was not a success at the box office, it drew generally favorable reviews from critics. The Fort Worth Star-Telegram reviewer wrote that "Hawke, building on the sympathetic-but-edgy presence that has served him well since his kid-actor days, is most impressive". In 1998, Hawke appeared alongside Gwyneth Paltrow and Robert De Niro in Great Expectations, a contemporary film adaptation of the Charles Dickens novel of the same name, directed by Alfonso Cuarón. During the same year, Hawke collaborated with Linklater again on The Newton Boys, based on the true story of the Newton Gang. Critical reviews for each film were mixed. The following year, Hawke starred in Snow Falling on Cedars, based on David Guterson's novel of the same title. Set in the Pacific Northwest and featuring a love affair between a European-American man and Japanese-American woman, the film met with an unenthusiastic reception; Entertainment Weekly noted, "Hawke scrunches himself into such a dark knot that we have no idea who Ishmael is or why he acts as he does."

2000s: Training Day, and Before Sunset
Hawke's next film role was in Michael Almereyda's 2000 film Hamlet, in which he played the title character. The film transposed the famous William Shakespeare play to contemporary New York City, a technique Hawke felt made the play more "accessible and vital". Salon reviewer wrote: "Hawke certainly isn't the greatest Hamlet of living memory ... but his performance reinforces Hamlet's place as Shakespeare's greatest character. And in that sense, he more than holds his own in the long line of actors who've played the part." In 2001, Hawke appeared in two more Linklater movies: Waking Life and Tape, both critically praised. In the animated Waking Life, he shared a single scene with former co-star Delpy continuing conversations begun in Before Sunrise. The real-time drama Tape, based on a play by Stephen Belber, takes place entirely in a single motel room with three characters played by Hawke, Robert Sean Leonard, and Uma Thurman. Hawke regarded Tape as his "first adult performance", a performance commended by Ebert for showing "both physical and verbal acting mastery".

Hawke's next role, and one for which he received substantial critical acclaim, came in Training Day (2001). Hawke played rookie cop Jake Hoyt, alongside Denzel Washington, as one of a pair of narcotics detectives from the Los Angeles Police Department spending 24 hours in the gang neighborhoods of South Los Angeles. The film was a box office hit, taking $104 million worldwide, and garnered generally favorable reviews. Variety wrote that "Hawke adds feisty and cunning flourishes to his role that allow him to respectably hold his own under formidable circumstances." Paul Clinton of CNN reported that Hawke's performance was "totally believable as a doe-eyed rookie going toe-to-toe with a legend [Washington]". Hawke himself described Training Day as his "best experience in Hollywood". His performance earned him Screen Actors Guild and Academy Award nominations for Best Supporting Actor.

Hawke pursued a number of projects away from acting throughout the early 2000s. He made his directorial debut with Chelsea Walls (2002), an independent drama about five struggling artists living in the famed Chelsea Hotel in New York City. The film was critically and financially unsuccessful. A second novel, 2002's Ash Wednesday, was better received and made the New York Times Best Seller list. The tale of an AWOL soldier and his pregnant girlfriend, the novel attracted critical praise. The Guardian called it "sharply and poignantly written ... makes for an intense one-sitting read". The New York Times noted that in the book Hawke displayed "a novelist's innate gifts ... a sharp eye, a fluid storytelling voice and the imagination to create complicated individuals", but was "weaker at narrative tricks that can be taught". In 2003, Hawke made a television appearance, guest starring in the second season of the television series Alias, where he portrayed a mysterious CIA agent.

In 2004, Hawke returned to film, starring in two features, Taking Lives and Before Sunset. Upon release, Taking Lives received broadly negative reviews, but Hawke's performance was favored by critics, with the Star Tribune noting that he "plays a complex character persuasively." Before Sunset, the sequel to Before Sunrise (1995) co-written by Hawke, Linklater, and Delpy, was much more successful. The Hartford Courant wrote that the three collaborators "keep Jesse and Celine iridescent and fresh, one of the most delightful and moving of all romantic movie couples." Hawke called it one of his favorite movies, a "romance for realists". Before Sunset was nominated for an Academy Award for Best Adapted Screenplay, Hawke's first screenwriting Oscar nomination.

Hawke starred in the 2005 action thriller Assault on Precinct 13, a loose remake of John Carpenter's 1976 film of the same title, with an updated plot. The film received ambivalent reviews; some critics praised the dark swift feel of the film, while others compared it unfavorably to John Carpenter's original. Hawke also appeared that year in the political crime thriller Lord of War, playing an Interpol agent chasing an arms dealer played by Nicolas Cage. In 2006, Hawke was cast in a supporting role in Fast Food Nation, directed by Richard Linklater based on Eric Schlosser's best-selling 2001 book. The same year, Hawke directed his second feature, The Hottest State, based on his eponymous 1996 novel. The film was released in August 2007 to a tepid reception.

In 2007, Hawke starred alongside Philip Seymour Hoffman, Marisa Tomei, and Albert Finney in the crime drama Before the Devil Knows You're Dead. The final work of Sidney Lumet, the film received critical acclaim. USA Today called it "highly entertaining", describing Hawke and Hoffman's performances as excellent. Peter Travers of Rolling Stone praised Hawke's performance, noting that he "digs deep to create a haunting portrayal of loss". The following year, Hawke starred with Mark Ruffalo in the crime drama What Doesn't Kill You. Despite the favorable reception, the film was not given a proper theatrical release due to the bankruptcy of its distributor. In 2009, Hawke appeared in two features: New York, I Love You, a romance movie comprising 12 short films, and Staten Island, a crime drama co-starring Vincent D'Onofrio and Seymour Cassel.

2010s: Before Midnight, Boyhood, First Reformed
In 2010, Hawke starred as a vampire hematologist in the science fiction horror film Daybreakers. Filmed in Australia with the Spierig brothers, the feature received reasonable reviews, and earned US$51 million worldwide. His next role was in Antoine Fuqua's Brooklyn's Finest as a corrupt narcotics officer. The film opened in March to a mediocre reception, yet his performance was well received, with the New York Daily News concluding, "Hawke—continuing an evolution toward stronger, more intense acting than anyone might've predicted from him 20 years ago—drives the movie." In the 2011 television adaptation of Herman Melville's Moby-Dick, Hawke played the role of Starbuck, the first officer to William Hurt's Captain Ahab. He then starred opposite Kristin Scott Thomas in Paweł Pawlikowski's The Woman in the Fifth, a "lush puzzler" about an American novelist struggling to rebuild his life in Paris.

In 2012, Hawke entered the horror genre for the first time, by playing a true crime writer in Scott Derrickson's Sinister, which grossed US$87 million at the worldwide box office—the film was the first in a series of highly profitable films for Hawke after the start of the new decade. In the week prior to the US opening of Sinister, Hawke explained that he was previously turned off by horror because good acting is not always required for success; however, the producer of Sinister, Jason Blum, who formerly ran a theater company with Hawke, made the offer to the actor based on the character and director.

During 2013, Hawke starred in three films of different genres. Before Midnight, the third installment of the Before series, reunited Hawke with Delpy and Linklater. Like its predecessors, the film garnered a considerable degree of critical acclaim; Variety wrote that "one of the great movie romances of the modern era achieves its richest and fullest expression in Before Midnight," and called the scene in the hotel room "one for the actors' handbook." The film earned co-writers Hawke, Linklater, and Delpy another Academy Award nomination, for Best Adapted Screenplay.

Hawke then starred in the horror-thriller The Purge, about an American future where crime is legal for one night of the year. Despite mixed reviews, the film topped the weekend box office with a US$34 million debut, the biggest opening of Hawke's career. Hawke's third film of 2013 was the action thriller Getaway, which was both critically and commercially unsuccessful.

The release of Linklater's Boyhood, a film shot over the course of 12 years, occurred in mid-2014. It follows the life of an American boy from age 6 to 18, with Hawke playing the protagonist's father. The film became the best-reviewed film of 2014, and was named "Best Film" of the year by numerous critics associations. Hawke said in an interview that the attention was a surprise to him. When he first became involved with Linklater's project, it did not feel like a "proper movie," and was like a "radical '60s film experiment or something". At the following awards season, the film was nominated for Academy Award for Best Picture, while winning Golden Globe Award for Best Motion Picture – Drama and BAFTA Award for Best Film. It also earned Hawke multiple awards nominations, including the Academy, BAFTA, Golden Globe, and SAG Award for Best Supporting Actor.

Hawke next worked with the Spierig brothers again on the science fiction thriller Predestination, in which Hawke plays a time-traveling agent on his final assignment. Following its premiere at the 2014 SXSW Film Festival, the film was released in Australia in August 2014 and in the US in January 2015. The film received largely positive reviews and was nominated for the AACTA Award for Best Film. He then reunited with his Gattaca director Andrew Niccol for Good Kill. In this modern war film, Hawke played a drone pilot with a troubled conscience, which led to The Hollywood Reporter calling it his "best screen role in years." Also in 2014, Hawke appeared in the movie Cymbeline which reunited him with his Assault on Precinct 13 co-star John Leguizamo.

In September 2014, Hawke's documentary debut, Seymour: An Introduction, screened at the Toronto International Film Festival (TIFF), winning second runner-up for TIFF's People's Choice Award for Best Documentary. Conceived after a dinner party at which both Hawke and Bernstein were present, the film is a profile of classical musician Seymour Bernstein, who explained that, even though he is typically a very private person, he was unable to decline Hawke's directorial request because he is "so endearing". Bernstein and Hawke developed a friendship through the filming process, and the classical pianist performed for one of Hawke's theater groups. The film was released in March 2015 to a warm reception; the Los Angeles Times reviewer described it as "quietly moving, indefinitely deep".

Hawke had two films premiered at the 2015 TIFF, both garnering favorable reviews. In Robert Budreau's drama film Born to Be Blue, he played the role of jazz musician Chet Baker. The film is set in the late 1960s and focuses on the musician's turbulent career comeback plagued by heroin addiction. His portrayal of Baker was well received; Rolling Stone noted that "Everything that makes Ethan Hawke an extraordinary actor — his energy, his empathy, his fearless, vanity-free eagerness to explore the deeper recesses of a character — is on view in Born to Be Blue." In Rebecca Miller's romantic comedy Maggie's Plan, Hawke starred as an anthropologist and aspiring novelist alongside Greta Gerwig and Julianne Moore. His other films that year included the coming-of-age drama Ten Thousand Saints and the psychological thriller Regression opposite Emma Watson. In November 2015, Hawke published his third novel, Rules for a Knight, in the form of a letter from a father to his four children about the moral values in life.

In 2016, Hawke starred in Ti West's western film In a Valley of Violence, in which he played a drifter seeking revenge in a small town controlled by its Marshal (John Travolta). He then portrayed two unpleasant characters in a row, first as the abusive father of a talented young baseball player in The Phenom, then as the harsh husband of Maud Lewis (played by Sally Hawkins) in Maudie. While some critics praised his unexpected turns, others felt that Hawke was "miscast" as a cruel figure. He subsequently reunited with Training Day director Antoine Fuqua and actor Denzel Washington for The Magnificent Seven (2016), a remake of the 1960 western film of the same name. On June 7, his fourth book, Indeh: A Story of the Apache Wars, a graphic novel he wrote with artist Greg Ruth, was released.

In 2017, Hawke appeared in a cameo role in the science fiction film Valerian and the City of a Thousand Planets by Luc Besson; and starred in Paul Schrader's drama film First Reformed, as a former military chaplain tortured by the loss of his son he encouraged to enlist in the armed forces, and focused on impending cataclysmic climate change. The film premiered at the 2017 Venice Film Festival to a positive reception.

In 2018, Hawke had two films premiere at the 2018 Sundance Film Festival. In Juliet, Naked, a romantic comedy adapted from Nick Hornby's novel of the same name, he appeared as an obscure rock musician whose eponymous album set the plot in motion. His third feature film, Blaze, based on the life of little-known country musician Blaze Foley, was selected in the festival's main competition section. In addition, Hawke starred in Budreau's crime thriller Stockholm which premiered at the 2018 Tribeca Film Festival. Hawke was in the 2019 western drama The Kid, directed by Vincent D'Onofrio.

2020s: Continued work 
In 2019, Hawke and Jason Blum adapted the book The Good Lord Bird into the miniseries based on the same name which premiered on October 4, 2020, on Showtime. He stars as abolitionist John Brown alongside Daveed Diggs, Ellar Coltrane, and includes an appearance of Maya Hawke. In the 2020 biographical film Tesla, he plays the title character, inventor and engineer Nikola Tesla.

His third novel, A Bright Ray of Darkness, was published in February 2021. In 2022, Hawke starred as the primary villain Arthur Harrow in the Disney+ streaming series Moon Knight, produced by Marvel Studios, and as serial killer of children The Grabber in the Blumhouse feature, The Black Phone. The latter marked Hawke's ninth collaboration with Blumhouse. Also that year, he appeared in Robert Eggers' The Northman, a 10th-century Viking epic which was filmed in Ireland, alongside Nicole Kidman, Anya Taylor-Joy, and Willem Dafoe.

In 2022, Hawke's six-part biographical documentary on Paul Newman and Joanne Woodward, The Last Movie Stars, was broadcast on HBO Max. Hawke also voiced Bruce Wayne/Batman in the animated children’s television series Batwheels.

Stage career
Hawke has described theater as his "first love", a place where he is "free to be more creative". Hawke made his Broadway debut in 1992, portraying the playwright Konstantin Treplev in Anton Chekhov's The Seagull at the Lyceum Theater in Manhattan. The following year Hawke was a co-founder and the artistic director of Malaparte, a Manhattan theater company, which survived until 2000. Outside the New York stage, Hawke made an appearance in a 1995 production of Sam Shepard's Buried Child, directed by Gary Sinise at the Steppenwolf Theater in Chicago. In 1999, he starred as Kilroy in the Tennessee Williams play Camino Real at the Williamstown Theater Festival in Massachusetts.

Hawke returned to Broadway in Jack O'Brien's 2003 production of Henry IV, playing Henry Percy (Hotspur). New York magazine wrote: "Ethan Hawke's Hotspur ... is a compelling, ardent creation." Ben Brantley of The New York Times reported that Hawke's interpretation of Hotspur might be "too contemporary for some tastes," but allowed "great fun to watch as he fumes and fulminates." In 2005, Hawke starred in the Off-Broadway revival of David Rabe's dark comedy Hurlyburly. The New York Times critic Brantley praised Hawke's performance as the central character Eddie, reporting that "he captures with merciless precision the sense of a sharp mind turning flaccid". The performance earned Hawke a Lucille Lortel Award nomination for Outstanding Lead Actor.

From November 2006 to May 2007, Hawke starred as Mikhail Bakunin in Tom Stoppard's trilogy play The Coast of Utopia, an eight-hour-long production at the Lincoln Center Theater in New York. The Los Angeles Times complimented Hawke's take on Bakunin, writing: "Ethan Hawke buzzes in and out as Bakunin, a strangely appealing enthusiast on his way to becoming a famous anarchist." The performance earned Hawke his first Tony Award nomination for Best Featured Actor in a Play. In November 2007, he directed Things We Want, a two-act play by Jonathan Marc Sherman, for the artist-driven Off-Broadway company The New Group. The play has four characters played by Paul Dano, Peter Dinklage, Josh Hamilton, and Zoe Kazan. New York magazine praised Hawke's "understated direction", particularly his ability to "steer a gifted cast away from the histrionics".

The following year, Hawke received the Michael Mendelson Award for Outstanding Commitment to the Theater. In his acceptance speech, Hawke said "I don't know why they're honoring me. I think the real reason they are honoring me is to help raise money for the theater company. Whenever the economy gets hit hard, one of the first thing  to go is people's giving, and last on that list of things people give to is the arts because they feel it's not essential. I guess I'm here to remind people that the arts are essential to our mental health as a country."

In 2009, Hawke appeared in two plays under British director Sam Mendes: as Trofimov in Chekhov's The Cherry Orchard and as Autolycus in Shakespeare's The Winter's Tale. The two productions, launched in New York as part of the Bridge Project, went on an eight-month tour in six countries. The Cherry Orchard won a mixed review from the New York Daily News, which wrote "Ethan Hawke ... fits the image of the 'mangy' student Trofimov, but one wishes he didn't speak with a perennial frog in his throat." Hawke's performance in The Winter's Tale was better received, earning him a Drama Desk Award nomination for Outstanding Featured Actor in a Play.

In January 2010, Hawke directed his second play, A Lie of the Mind, by Sam Shepard on the New York stage. It was the first major Off-Broadway revival of the play since its 1985 premiere. Hawke said that he was drawn to the play's take on "the nature of reality", and its "weird juxtaposition of humor and mysticism". In his review for The New York Times, Ben Brantley noted the production's "scary, splendid clarity", and praised Hawke for eliciting a performance that "connoisseurs of precision acting will be savoring for years to come". Entertainment Weekly commented that although A Lie of the Mind "wobbles a bit in its late stages", Hawke's "hearty" revival managed to "resurrect the spellbinding uneasiness of the original". The production garnered five Lucille Lortel Award nominations including Outstanding Revival, and earned Hawke a Drama Desk Award nomination for Outstanding Director of a Play.

Hawke next starred in the Off-Broadway premiere of a new play, Tommy Nohilly's Blood from a Stone, from December 2010 to February 2011. The play was not a critical success, but Hawke's portrayal of the central character Travis earned positive feedback; The New York Times said he was "remarkably good at communicating the buried sensitivity beneath Travis's veneer of wary resignation." A contributor from the New York Post noted it was Hawke's "best performance in years". Hawke won an Obie Award for his role in Blood from a Stone. The following year Hawke played the title role in Chekhov's Ivanov at the Classic Stage Company. In early 2013, he starred in and directed a new play Clive, inspired by Bertolt Brecht's Baal and written by Jonathan Marc Sherman. Later that year, he played the title role in a Broadway production of Macbeth at the Lincoln Center Theater, but his performance failed to win over the critics, with the New York Post calling it "underwhelming" for showing untimely restraint in a flashy production.

In 2019, Hawke returned to Broadway in the revival of Sam Shepard's True West, co-starring Paul Dano. The show was met with critical acclaim. It received the Critic's Pick from The New York Times. The show's previews began on December 27, 2018, and officially opened January 24, 2019, closing on March 17, 2019. Hawke is a member of the LAByrinth theatre company.

Personal life
Hawke lives in Boerum Hill, a Brooklyn neighborhood in New York City, and owns a small island in Nova Scotia, Canada. He is a second cousin twice-removed of Tennessee Williams on his father's side. Hawke's maternal grandfather, Howard Lemuel Green, served five terms in the Texas Legislature (1957–67), served as the elected Tarrant County Judge in Texas from 1967 to 1975, and was also a minor-league baseball commissioner.

Family

On May 1, 1998, Hawke married actress Uma Thurman, whom he had met on the set of Gattaca in 1996. They have two children, Maya (b. 1998) and Levon Roan Thurman-Hawke (b. 2002). The couple separated in 2003 amid allegations of Hawke's infidelity, and filed for divorce the following year. The divorce was finalized in August 2005.

In 2008, Hawke married Ryan Shawhughes, who had briefly worked as a nanny to his and Thurman's children before graduating from Columbia University. Dismissing speculation about their relationship, Hawke said, "my [first] marriage disintegrated due to many pressures, none of which were remotely connected to Ryan." They have two daughters.

Beliefs
Hawke identifies as a feminist and has criticized "the movie business [being] such a boys' club." He has also spoken in support of Colin Kaepernick and individual rights.

Philanthropy
Hawke has served as a co-chair of the New York Public Library's Young Lions Committee, one of New York's major philanthropic boards. In 2001, Hawke co-founded the Young Lions Fiction Award, an annual prize for achievements in fiction by writers under 35. In November 2010, he was honored as a Library Lion by the New York Public Library. In May 2016, Hawke joined the library's board of trustees.

Politics
Hawke supports the Democratic Party, and supported Bill Bradley, John Kerry, Barack Obama, and Hillary Clinton for President of the United States in 2000, 2004, 2008, and 2016, respectively. He is also a supporter of gay rights; in March 2011, he and his wife released a video supporting same-sex marriage in New York.

In an October 2012 interview, Hawke said that he prefers great art to politics, explaining that his preference shows "how little" he cares about the latter; "I think about the first people of our generation to do great art. I see Michael Chabon write a great book; when I see Philip Seymour Hoffman do Death of a Salesman last year—I see people of my generation being fully realized in their work, and I find that really kind of exciting. But politics? I don't know. Paul Ryan is certainly not my man."

Hawke was critical of Donald Trump, criticizing him for his Make America Great Again slogan, and for threatening to put Hillary Clinton in jail. According to Hawke, members of his family voted for Trump.

Filmography

Film

Television

Theater

Discography

Awards and nominations

Publications

References

External links

 
 
 
 
 
 Ethan Hawke at The Filmaholic
 Ethan Hawke Interview on Texas Monthly Talks (November 2007)

1970 births
Living people
20th-century American male actors
20th-century American male writers
20th-century American novelists
21st-century American male actors
21st-century American male writers
21st-century American novelists
Activists from New York (state)
American male child actors
American male film actors
American male novelists
American male screenwriters
American male Shakespearean actors
American male stage actors
American male voice actors
American theatre directors
Best Supporting Actor Genie and Canadian Screen Award winners
Carnegie Mellon University College of Fine Arts alumni
Daytime Emmy Award winners
Film directors from New Jersey
Film directors from New York City
Film directors from Texas
Hun School of Princeton alumni
Independent Spirit Award for Best Male Lead winners
Male actors from Austin, Texas
Male actors from New Jersey
Male actors from New York City
Male feminists
New York (state) Democrats
New York University alumni
Novelists from New Jersey
Novelists from Texas
Obie Award recipients
People from West Windsor, New Jersey
Screenwriters from New York (state)
Screenwriters from Texas
Texas Democrats
West Windsor-Plainsboro High School South alumni
Writers from Austin, Texas
Writers from Manhattan